is a Japanese manga created by Ken Akamatsu. Originally a one-chapter production, it ran in Japan before Akamatsu's Love Hina was serialized. It ran in Shōnen Magazine in 1997, and was serialized in volumes 4 and 5. An anime OVA, with two episodes, was released on December 8, 2005, in Japan. The anime OVA was licensed in the United States by Funimation, and was scheduled to be released in the USA on December 11, 2007. However, the video was recalled when it was discovered that, due to a misprint, the DVD was labeled TV-PG when it was intended to be TV-MA.

Plot
In the story, a girl called Mai appears before a boy who happens to dislike Christmas. As it turns out he was born on December 24 and thus was named Santa, causing him to hate the holiday. Moreover, as a child, he never had any festive occasions, such as birthday parties. With the power of Christmas, Mai is given the mission to improve his luck and change his views for the better.

Characters
 
 
 A lonely boy who dislikes Christmas. He is often teased for his odd name. As he grew up, his parents were never there for him. His view of Christmas changes when he meets Mai.
 
 
 A student at the Santa Claus Academy that has problems using her magic. She can only conjure up things that start with "san" (サン) in the Japanese language. She was sent to San-chan to cheer him up as her mission but eventually falls in love with him in the process.  Mai first appears to San-chan as a junior high school student. Later when San-chan starts to believe in Santa Claus, Mai gains enough Christmas powers to change into her grown-up form. In adult form, Mai oddly enough uses the hyper-masculine "Ore" (as opposed to the traditionally feminine "Atashi") when referring to herself, despite the feminine appeal that she gains with her transformation.
  (aka Shirley) (OVA anime only)
 
 Mai's best friend and rival. Unlike Mai, she is an elite in Santa Claus Academy. She says "Gorgeous" whenever she uses her magic, which can make any objects present to her grow to very large proportions. She was sent back to retrieve Mai in order for her to finish up her studies at the academy. 
  (OVA anime only)
 
 Mai's little sister who came to live with Mai. She has the tendency to tag along with her big sister (onee-chan) wherever she goes. She also slaps anyone that interferes with her spending some time with her onee-chan. At the end of the OVA, it is revealed that Mai snuck away from the Santa Claus Academy and is, in fact, the one that Sharry was supposed to retrieve.
  (aka Miss Noel) (OVA anime only)
 
 A teacher from the Santa Claus Academy. She is the one that tells Mai that she has to say good-bye to San-chan because she has to go back home and continue her studies. Although, Mai might've misunderstood her when she told her this.

Release

Serialized in Shōnen Magazine in 1997 the manga has since been released in German by Egmont Manga & Anime and in French by Pika.

References

External links 
 Itsudatte My Santa section on Ken Akamatsu's homepage 
  
 
 

1997 manga
2005 anime OVAs
Anime and manga controversies
Christmas in anime and manga
Funimation
Ken Akamatsu
Rating controversies in television
Romantic comedy anime and manga
Shōnen manga
TNK (company)